The tennis competition at the 1991 European Youth Olympic Days was held from 18 to 20 July. The events took place in Brussels, Belgium. Girls and boys  born 1976 or 1977 or later participated in the event. Singles competition only was presented.

Medal summary

References

Tennis
European Youth Olympic Days
1991
1991 European Youth Olympic Days
1991 in Belgian tennis